Hourman (Richard "Rick" Tyler) is a fictional superhero who was created by Roy Thomas, Dann Thomas and first appeared in Infinity Inc. #20 as Rick Tyler, son of the original Hourman, who quickly joined Infinity Inc. as the second Hourman in #21 of that book.

Rick Tyler made his live-action debut in Stargirl portrayed by Cameron Gellman.

Fictional character biography

Childhood
Rick Tyler was born the child of Rex Tyler, who was a successful hero and a business man. However, Rex wasn't a very good father, something he later admitted and regretted. When Rex wasn't spending time with business, he was out doing his superhero work, as addicted to it as he was to the substance that powered him, Miraclo. This meant that Rick rarely saw his dad, even on his birthdays, and eventually Rex wasn't even sure of the age of his son.

It was no surprise that although Rick would develop into a well-balanced teen, he was consistently looking for his father's guidance and approval. Yet, Rex could not see the role model Rick really needed, and he tried to push Rick's education to its limits, an endeavor that Rick didn't wish to pursue, and he constantly felt inferior to his father.

Infinity Inc.
Rick became the second Hourman when the Crisis on Infinite Earths threatened all of reality, and he used one of his dad's Miraclo pills to save the life of Beth Chapel, whom he grew quite fond of. His father strongly disapproved of Rick's actions, knowing the addictive effects of Miraclo and tried to prevent Rick from taking up the Hourman mantle. Nonetheless, Rick ended up trying to join a team of other 2nd generation heroes known as Infinity, Inc. Rex was able to temporarily convince his son not to, although Rick continued to try to persuade him.

Matters became worse however when Rex, along with his teammates in the Justice Society of America sacrificed themselves to fight eternal Ragnarok in Limbo. When Northwind and Beth Chapel came to tell him of the news, Rick ran away in grief. He was later kidnapped by the new group Justice Unlimited, themselves former members of the Injustice Society and used as a hostage against Infinity Inc. Rick was able to escape, but in the process, seemingly killed the Wizard.

Rick had a hard time forgiving himself, although it would later be revealed that the Wizard was in fact still alive. Rick gave up the Hourman identity almost as soon as he assumed it, as he angrily unmasked himself before a press photographer. Luckily, Lyta was able to prevent the photo from being taken and took Rick away, trying to console him.

Nonetheless, Rick wore his Hourman outfit another time to attend the court hearing for the villain Mister Bones, although Rick feared he was just as bad as Bones as well, fearing that the Miraclo pills had simply worked on an already violent urge when he killed the Wizard. Eventually though, Rick returned to becoming Hourman, wearing an outfit similar to his father's in honor of him. Shortly afterwards, Infinity Inc. disbanded.

Retired hero and reunion
Eventually, Rex and the rest of the JSA returned from Limbo and he and Rick were reunited. In the meantime, Rick had contracted leukaemia due to the prolonged exposure to Miraclo. With the help of Rex's old teammate, Johnny Chambers (aka Johnny Quick), both Rex and Rick learned to tap into their superhuman powers without the use of Miraclo and instead using his mind-focusing technique.

Father and son would only spend a short time together, when the villain Extant killed Rex and some of his allies from the Justice Society during the event known as Zero Hour. Tragedy kept on striking, when shortly afterwards his sweetheart, Beth Chapel (as Dr. Midnight II) was slain by Eclipso.

Rick remained retired from the superhero business for a long time, and in that time he met the new android Hourman. This android had been engineered by his time travelling father from Rex's own DNA. Although Rick intensely disliked the new Hourman, he was saved by the android when he transported Rick into the Timepoint (a place where time stands still), so that he would be spared from an unidentifiable alien illness.

The two would grow closer when the android then cured Rick of his cancer and bestowed him two gifts. Due to a tachyon-enhanced hourglass, Rick was now able to occasionally see one hour into the future, as well as being given an hour with his dad in the Timepoint. The Hourman android had plucked Rex out of the timestream before he was killed fighting Extant, placing him in the Timepoint - an area outside of time - for an hour; when Rick was not in the Timepoint, time stood still, but when he entered it he could interact with his father for advice or simple conversation. When the hour in the Timepoint would be up, Rex would be sent back in time, where he would fight and die. The transportation to the Timepoint would be activated by a button in Rick's Hourman gloves.

The Justice Society
Now cured of all his illnesses, Rick resumed the mantle of Hourman (adopting a new costume in the process), using the non-addictive form of Miraclo, and joined a makeshift JSA in defeating the Ultra-Humanite after he stole Johnny Thunder's Thunderbolt, Rick taking a brief visit to the Timepoint to get his father's advice on how to defeat the powerful genie. Rick remained with the JSA after this battle and began growing close to Jesse Chambers, who was the JSA's business manager and also the superheroine Jesse Quick. Rick is still close to his mother and has a strained relationship with his cousin Rebecca who runs his father's company TylerCo.

When the JSA travelled with Hawkman to the Middle Eastern country of Kahndaq to stop Black Adam, Rick was severely injured by one of Nemesis' swords (a member of Adam's gathered group). Realizing that he would die from the massive blood loss unless he was quickly operated on, Rick saw no choice but to transport himself to the Timepoint where his father was. Rick quickly swapped places with his father, and the Timepoint held Rick and his wounds in stasis. Rex was returned to the regular world and was left with no means of returning to the Timepoint or how he could save his son.

The answer once again came in the form of the android Hourman, who transported Rex and several other JSA members to the Timepoint, amongst them the latest Doctor Mid-Nite (Pieter Cross), who was able to save Rick's life. The time used to save Rick also meant that Rex's time was up, and that he would have to return to fighting Extant. Rick, however, tried to take his place, so that his father could live again. Instead, the android Hourman sacrificed himself so that both Hourmen may live. Rex retrieved the damaged Hourman parts and is trying to rebuild him, while Rick continues to operate with the JSA.

While returning once more to Kahndaq to face the Spectre, Rick's friend Jakeem Thunder tried to trap the Spectre inside his magical pen, but was instead himself thrown into the 5th Dimension. Rick, Mr. Terrific and Stargirl ventured into the 5th Dimension and rescued Jakeem from the thralls of Qwsp.

One Year Later
Rick is part of the newly reformed Justice Society of America and is married to Jesse Chambers, now going by the name Liberty Belle. They were responsible for bringing Damage into the Justice Society of America, and the trio defeated Captain Nazi.

DC Universe
In the "Watchmen" sequel "Doomsday Clock", Hourman appears with the Justice Society after Doctor Manhattan undoes the experiment that erased the Justice Society of America and the Legion of Super-Heroes.

Powers and abilities

Like the original Hourman, Rex Tyler, Rick imbibes the drug, Miraclo, granting him super strength, speed, agility, reflexes, and durability for exactly sixty minutes. The nature of Miraclo's effectiveness has changed in explanation over the years, at times being described as a mega-vitamin, a steroid, a chemical enhancement, meta-gene enabler, and a placebo covering the release of metahuman potential. The latter, proposed by Johnny Quick, was generally dismissed by the Tylers. The effectiveness of Miraclo varies based on the subject's age, physical conditioning, and frequency of use. Rick's description of his abilities rarely matched their depiction; while he described his strength as the combined effort of five Olympic-level athletes, he was shown doing considerably more. Based on depictions, under its effects, Rick experienced the ability to lift/press 10 tons, run at speeds of 65 miles/hour, agility to leap from windows as high as three stories, reflexes enough to spar with super-speedsters, and durability to withstand superhuman blows.

Generally, Rick used a single Miraclo pill for action based on the dosages created by his father; however, the drug is more potent in larger doses, though it lasts a fraction of the time. During an attack on the android hourman, a dual dose lasted Rick only ten minutes, but enhanced the regular effects by a substantial margin, allowing him to keep up with the android, albeit temporarily.

Once the one hour time period is over, the drug metabolizes into the user's system. Repeated dosages have limited, if any effect, until approximately 23 hours have passed, at which point the drug's effects return to full potency. Rick, like his father Rex, often noticed that usage carried psychologically addictive properties, even if physical addition was not an issue. Because of the 'rush' from having enhanced abilities, especially when used in conjunction with a superhero lifestyle, the period following usage was coupled by a feeling of disappointment, insecurity, and an eagerness to reach the next effective dose. Rick struggled with this until joining the re-formed Justice Society.

After reconciling with the android Hourman from the future, he was given a special hourglass that caused him to experience random visions of one hour in the future. The visions were extremely detailed and gave him information covering approximately one hour of time taking place one hour in the future; this process was temporarily painful, but granted a strategic advantage and allowed Rick to time his doses more effectively, allowing his "hour of power" to cover the entirety of the crisis contained in the vision.

The hourglass on his chest was once able to take him to a limbo chamber at Timepoint, but this ability has been used up.

Without Miraclo, Hourman is no more powerful than a regular human. He can only use one dose of Miraclo a day, as its long term abuse may prove detrimental for his health. Hourman's Miraclo is dispensed directly into his bloodstream by the hourglass amulets embedded in his costume's gauntlets.

Other versions
In 2011, "The New 52" rebooted the DC universe. The Earth-2 version of Rick Tyler/Hourman was introduced in the sixth issue of Earth 2: Society. He is depicted as a villain and works alongside Jimmy Olsen (Doctor Impossible), Johnny Sorrow, and Anarky. Three months prior to the series, Rick broke into Waynecorp to retrieve Thomas Wayne's Miraclo supplies which he used when operating as Batman. Rick is motivated by revenge and views Thomas Wayne as a thief for taking his father's Miraclo which was the only thing that could've saved his family. Jimmy Olsen helps him escape and the two decide to work together to achieve Jimmy's goal. Present day, Hourman arrives to fight Batman, Flash, and Superman. Using Miraclo, Rick was able to hold out on his own and fight the Wonders. Flash was able to disarm Hourman of his Miraclo as the heroes discovered that this was a diversion so that Doctor Impossible can raid Wayne Tower. Hourman later appears as a minion of Kyle Nimbus at the time when Batman raids Nimbus solutions. Batman had to dodge Hourman's attacks. When Nimbus is unaffected by Batman's batarang and throws it back at him, Hourman is left to finish the job as Batman calls for Red Arrow and Ted Grant. By the time Red Arrow and Ted Grant have arrived, they find that Batman has defeated Hourman. While revealing that he dosed Hourman with something to counter the Miracloe, Batman stated that he also removed the mind-control that Nimbus used on the Miraclo that Hourman just used. After noting that Hourman has a bad taste in paymasters, Dick Grayson hired Hourman to help make the world better. He accepted and helped in the fight against Ultra-Humanite.

In other media
 Rick Tyler / Hourman makes non-speaking appearances in Justice League Unlimited as a member of an expanded Justice League.
 Rick Tyler appears in Stargirl, portrayed by Cameron Gellman as a young adult and Boston Pierce as a child. This version uses an hourglass amulet to achieve his powers. In his early life, Rick was raised by his Uncle Matt after his parents Rex and Wendi were killed in a car accident outside of Blue Valley and became a delinquent at Blue Valley High School. In the episode "Hourman and Dr. Mid-Nite", Rick learns Solomon Grundy killed his parents and his father was the hero Hourman. Seeking vengeance for his parents, Rick takes up his father's mantle and amulet and joins Stargirl's Justice Society of America (JSA). In addition, Pat Dugan gives him Rex's journal to decipher so they can foil the Injustice Society's plans. In the two-part season one finale, "Stars and S.T.R.I.P.E.", Rick confronts and defeats Grundy, but spares the zombie's life and lets him go. In season two, Rick discovers Grundy lurking in the nearby forest and breaking into restaurants for food. Sympathizing with him, Rick leaves food for the zombie. However, Eclipso causes Rick to hallucinate Grundy killing a little girl before manipulating the former into attacking Matt and breaking the amulet, leading to Rick being arrested. While in prison, he uses his father's journal to rebuild the amulet before he is released from prison after Dugan tortures Matt into dropping the charges and helps the JSA in their final battle against Eclipso. In season three, Rick develops an addiction to the amulet after being unknowingly manipulated by the Ultra-Humanite in Starman's body into removing the amulet's limiter, unaware that the limiter prevented such addiction.
 Ahead of the series premiere, Rick makes a cameo appearance in "Crisis on Infinite Earths" via archive footage from the Stargirl episode "The Justice Society".

References

External links
 DCU Guide to Hourman

DC Comics male superheroes
Comics characters introduced in 1985
Characters created by Roy Thomas
DC Comics characters with superhuman strength
DC Comics metahumans
Earth-Two
Fictional artists
Fictional characters with precognition
Characters created by Todd McFarlane